Sawai may refer to:

Sawai (surname), a Japanese surname
Sawai (title), a title of honor used in India
Sawai language, a South Halmahera language of Austronesian stock spoken in Indonesia
Sawai, Car Nicobar, a village in the Andaman and Nicobar Islands, India
Sawai Station, a railway station in Ōme, Tokyo, Japan
Manilkara kanosiensis, a tropical rainforest tree